Division No. 5 is a census division in Alberta, Canada. It is located in the north-central portion of southern Alberta and its largest urban community is the Town of Strathmore.

Census subdivisions 
The following census subdivisions (municipalities or municipal equivalents) are located within Alberta's Division No. 5.

Towns
Drumheller
Strathmore
Three Hills
Trochu
Vulcan
Villages
Acme
Arrowwood
Carbon
Carmangay
Champion
Delia
Hussar
Linden
Lomond
Milo
Morrin
Munson
Rockyford
Standard
Municipal districts
Kneehill County
Starland County
Vulcan County
Wheatland County
Indian reserves
Siksika 146

Demographics 

See also 
List of census divisions of Alberta
List of communities in Alberta

References

D05